I Cry may refer to

Music
I Cry (album), 2008 EP by Rotersand
"I Cry" (Flo Rida song), 2012
"I Cry" (Ja Rule song), 2001 Ja Rule song featuring Lil' Mo
"I Cry" (Tammy Cochran song), 2001
"I Cry" (Usher song), 2020
"I Cry", a 1965 song by Tages
"I Cry", a song by Westlife from their 2001 album World of Our Own
"I Cry", a song by Julian Perretta from his 2016 album Karma
"I Cry (Night After Night)", a song by Egyptian Lover from his 1984 album On the Nile

See also
 Cry (disambiguation)
 I Cried (disambiguation)
 I Cry for You, a 1955 studio album by Johnnie Ray